Diario segreto da un carcere femminile (International title: Women in Cell Block 7, UK title: Love in a Woman's Prison) is a 1973 Italian women in prison film written and directed by Rino Di Silvestro. It represents the directorial debut of Di Silvestro and the first Italian women in prison film.

Cast 
 Anita Strindberg: Hilda 
 Eva Czemerys: Mother S. 
 Jenny Tamburi: Daniela Vinci 
 Cristina Gaioni: Religious prisoner 
 Bedy Moratti: Pyromaniac 
 Massimo Serato: Warden 
 Elisa Mainardi: Prison Matron 
 Olga Bisera: Gerda  
 Valeria Fabrizi: Napolitana 
 Paola Senatore: Musumeci 
 Roger Browne: Inspector Weil 
 Franco Fantasia: Chief Inspector
 Umberto Raho: Daniela's lawyer 
 Gabriella Giorgelli

References

External links

https://www.youtube.com/watch?v=Ah5QfNUgL4w&t=3252s 

1973 films
Italian prison films
1970s Italian-language films
1970s exploitation films
Women in prison films
1970s prison films
1970s Italian films